This is a list of notable Muhajir people. Muslims that migrated mainly from North India after the independence of Pakistan in 1947.

Political
 Aamir Liaquat Hussain (former MNA N.A 245 PTI)
 Abida Sultan, former crown princess, Bhopal
 Abul A'la Maududi, founder of Jamaat-e-Islami 
 Afaq Ahmed, founder and leader of Mohajir Qaumi Movement Pakistan
 Ahmad Noorani Siddiqi, leader of the Jamiat Ulema-e-Pakistan, founder of the World Islamic Mission
 Ali Rashid, MQM
 Ali Zaidi, PTI Karachi president
 Altaf Hussain, founder and leader of MQM
 Amir Khan, senior deputy convener of MQM
 Azeem Ahmed Tariq, former chairman of (MQM)
 Babar Khan Ghauri, (MQM)
 Chaudhry Khaliquzzaman
 Faisal Sabzwari, (MQM)
 Farooq Sattar, former mayor of Karachi, MNA, convener of MQM
 Moinuddin Haider, ex army general, governor, interior minister
 Fatima Jinnah, co-founder of Pakistan
 Fauzia Wahab, secretary-general of the Central Executive Committee of PPP                                                                                        
 Gholam Mujtaba                                                                                        
 Habib Ibrahim Rahimtoola, ambassador, governor, minister
 Haider Abbas Rizvi (MQM)
 Hammad Siddiqui (former MQM)
 Imran Farooq co-founder of MQM
 Ismail Ibrahim Chundrigar, former prime minister of Pakistan
 Ishrat-ul-Ibad Khan, former governor of Sindh province
 Josh Malihabadi
 Mubashir Hassan, co-founder of PPP
 Muhammad Ali Jinnah, founder of Pakistan
 Mamnoon Hussain, Former President of Islamic Republic of Pakistan 
 Naimatullah Khan, former mayor of Karachi City
 Nawab Mohsin-ul-Mulk
 Princess Sarvath El Hassan, Princess of Jordan
 Qadeeruddin Ahmed (governor, judge)
 Rahimuddin Khan, general (retd.) former military governor of Sindh, Balochistan province
 Ra'ana Liaquat Ali Khan
 Shaukat Aziz, former prime minister and finance minister of Pakistan
 Sheikh Liaquat Hussain
 Syed Aminul Haque
 Syed Amir-uddin Kedwaii
 Syed Ali Abbas Jalalpuri
 Sheikh Salahuddin
 Faisal Raza Abidi (ex-senator, ex-PPP)
 Syeda Shehla Raza, PPP, current Deputy Speaker of Sindh Assembly
 Taj Haider
 Liaquat Ali Khan
 Nasreen Jalil, Govener of Sindh
 Syed Munawar Hasan, EX Ameer Jamaat-e-Islami Pakistan
 Farahnaz Ispahani
 Sadiq Khan, mayor of london

Bureaucrats
 Ikramullah- Pakistan's first foreign secretary considered to be founder of foreign office.
 Rizwan Ahmed- secretary to Government of Pakistan (Federal Secretary)
 Agha Shahi
 Sahabzada Yaqub Khan- prince of former Rampur State. Ex-foreign minister of Pakistan.
 Shahryar Khan- former foreign secretary and present chairman Cricket Board in Pakistan. Prince of former Bhopal State and Kurwai State.
 Sahabzada Yaqub Khan
 Agha Hilaly
 Syed Murad Ahmed Khairi- ambassador of Pakistan
 Zafar Hilaly
 Abul Hassan Isphani

Journalists
 Ahfaz-ur-Rahman
 Arman Sabir
 Atif Tauqeer
 Azhar Abbas
 Kamran Khan 
 Mujahid Barelvi
 Shahzeb Khanzada
 Syed Saleem Shahzad
 Waseem Badami

Science and technology
 Abdul Qadeer Khan (metallurgist and founder of Pakistan's Nuclear Programme)
 Ahmed Mohiuddin (zoologist)
 Abdul Hameed Nayyar (nuclear physicist)
 Atta-ur-Rahman (chemist)
 Faheem Hussain (theoretical physicist)
 Hafeez Hoorani (particle physicist)
 Muhammad Hafeez Qureshi (nuclear physicist)
 Pervez Hoodbhoy (nuclear physicist)
 Raziuddin Siddiqui (astrophysicist and mathematician)
 Salimuzzaman Siddiqui (HI, MBE, SI, D.Phil.)), (scientist in natural products chemistry, founder of H.E.J. Research Institute of Chemistry
 M. Shahid Qureshi (astrophysicist and mathematician)
 Ishrat Hussain Usmani (founder of Atomic Energy Commission of Pakistan)
 Ishfaq Ahmad (Pakistan Atomic Energy, Nishan_e_imtiaz)
 A R Hye, architect, first Chief Architect of the Government of West Pakistan.
 Asifa Akhtar Biologist Gene therapist
 Mohammad Sajjad Alam
 Javed Jabbar

Armed forces
 Shamim Alam Khan
 Pervez Musharraf (ex-President)
 Muhammad Zia-ul-Haq (ex-President)
 Rahimuddin Khan
 Athar Abbas 
 Shahid Karimullah (Ambassador)
 Akhtar Abdur Rahman
 Moinuddin Haider (ex-Governor of Sindh and Federal Interior Minister)
 Syed Mohammad Ahsan (Governor)
 Sarfaraz Ahmed Rafiqui
 Muhammad Mahmood Alam (War hero of Pakistan Air Force)
 Moinuddin Haider
 Mirza Aslam Baig
 Syed Shahid Hamid
 Syed Arifullah Hussaini (Commander Pakistan Fleet)
 Shahid Aziz
 Asim Munir (general)

Education

 Abu Bakr Ahmad Haleem (Vice Chancellor Karachi University)
 Dr.Abdul Wahab, Vice Chancellor Karachi University
 Abul Khair Kashfi (author, critic, linguist, scholar)
 Abul Lais Siddiqui (author, critic, linguist, scholar)
 Ata ur Rahman (Chairman HEC, scientist)
 Farman Fatehpuri (real name: Syed Dildar Ali; author, critic, linguist, scholar)
 Ghulam Mustafa Khan (author, critic, linguist, scholar, Sufi)
 Hakim Saeed (Vice Chancellor Hamdard University)
 Ishtiaq Hussain Qureshi (Vice Chancellor Karachi University, author, historian, scholar)
 Jameel Jalibi (linguist, scholar)
 Aslam Farrukhi (author, poet, critic, linguist, scholar)
 Rehmat Farrukhabadi (historian, critic, author)
 Khalida Ghous (human rights activist, scholar)
 Mahmud Hussain (Vice Chancellor)
 Dr. Mohammad Ajmal Khan
 Moinuddin Aqeel (author, critic, linguist, scholar)
 Nomanul Haq (International scholar, Intellectual historian)
 Nasim Amrohvi
 Pirzada Qasim Raza Siddiqui (Vice Chancellor Karachi University, scientist, author, poet, scholar)
 Raziuddin Siddiqui (physicist, mathematician, scholar)
 Shahid Aziz Siddiqi (former Federal Secretary, Vice Chancellor Ziauddin University)
 Sulaiman Shahabuddin, President of Aga Khan university
 Syed Akbar Zaidi, Executive Director of the Institute of Business Administration (IBA)
 Shakil Auj
 Syed Ali Abbas Jalalpuri
 Khurshid Ahmad

Arts and literature
 Ahmed Ali , Pioneer of Urdu short stories
 Sibt-e-Jaafar Zaidi (soazkhuwan)
 Abdul Haq, Moulvi (father of modern Urdu)
 Abul Khair Kashfi, Prof. Dr. (critic, linguist, author, scholar)
 Abul Lais Siddiqui, Prof. Dr. (critic, linguist, author, scholar)
 Altaf Fatima (novelist, author)
 Anwar Maqsood (drama writer, anchor, actor)
 Aslam Farrukhi, Prof. Dr. (writer, critic, linguist)
 Rehmat Farrukhabadi (historian, critic, author)
 Bushra Rahman, writer
 Dilawer Figar (humorous poet, scholar)
 Farman Fatehpuri, Prof. Dr. (researcher, poet, critic, linguist)
 Fatima Surayya Bajia (drama writer)
 Fehmida Riaz (writer, poet, activist)
 Ghazi Salahuddin (writer, literary figure, and the scholar of political science)
 Ghulam Mustafa Khan, Prof. Dr. (writer, critic, linguist, researcher, scholar, educationist)
 Hakeem Muhammad Saeed (pioneer of Eastern medicine, philanthropist)
 Hameed Haroon (journalist, activist)
 Hasan Abidi (scholar, poet, journalist)
 Muhammad Hasan Askari (philosopher, author, critic)
 Haseena Moin (playwright, drama writer)
 Ibn-e-Safi (novelist, story writer)
 Iftikhar Arif (poet, critic, author)
 Intizar Hussain (linguist, novelist, critic)
 Ishtiaq Hussain Qureshi (author, historian, educationist)
 Jamil Jalibi (scholar, critic, linguist, former VC KU)
 Jamiluddin Aali (poet, columnist, critic)
 Jaun Elia (poet, philosopher)
 Josh Malihabadi (poet, linguist, scholar)
 Kamila Shamsie (novelist, story writer)
 Khalique Ibrahim Khalique (journalist, poet, critic)
 Manzoor Ahmad (philosopher)
 Mubarak Ali (historian, activist, columnist)
 Mushtaq Ahmad Yusufi (author, humorist)
 Mustafa Zaidi (poet)
 Muzaffar Warsi (poet)
 Nasim Amrohvi (poet, author, linguist, scholar, activist, journalist, educator, philosopher)
 Obaidullah Aleem (journalist, poet)
 Obaidullah Baig ( scholar, Urdu writer/novelist, columnist, media expert & documentary filmmaker)
 Parveen Shakir (poet, author, scholar)
 Pirzada Qasim (poet, author, educationist)
 Qaem Amrohvi (poet, philosopher)
 Rais Amrohvi (journalist, poet, psychoanalyst)
 Raees Warsi (journalist, author, poet, founder of Urdu Markaz New York)
 Sadequain (painter, calligraphist)
 Shafiq-ur-Rahman (humorist)
 Shaista Suhrawardy Ikramullah (writer, woman activist)
 Shakeb Jalali (poet, journalist, story writer, columnist)
 Shakeel Badayuni (news reader)
 Shan-ul-Haq Haqqee, Dr. (researcher, linguist, poet, author)
 Shaukat Siddiqui (novelist, fiction writer)
 Shaukat Thanvi (writer, humourist)
 Sibte Hassan (author, columnist, activist)
 Tabish Dehlvi (poet)
 Zahida Hina (columnist, author, poet)
 Zaib-un-Nissa Hamidullah (first female columnist of Pakistan)
 Zehra Nigah (poet)
 Zamir Ali Badayuni (critic)
 Junaid Jamshed (Religious figure, former pop star)

Philanthropists
 Abdul Sattar Edhi
 Hakim Said, medical researcher
 Irfan Pardesi, entrepreneur and philanthropist 
 Agha Hasan Abedi, banker and philanthropist
 Ramzan Chippa

Social activists
 Abdul Sattar Edhi
 Ansar Burney
 Fahmida Riaz
 Nafis Sadik (United Nations)
 Akhtar Hameed Khan
 Sabeen Mahmud
 Muhammad Jibran Nasir

Economics
 Agha Hasan Abedi (banker)
 Akhtar Hameed Khan (pioneer of microcredit and microfinance in Pakistan, founder of Orangi Pilot Project)
 Imtiaz Alam Hanfi (former governor State Bank of Pakistan)
 Ishrat Husain (former governor State Bank of Pakistan)
 Nawab Haider Naqvi (former director PIDE)
 Shaukat Aziz (economist, ex prime minister)
 Syed Salim Raza (former governor State Bank of Pakistan)
 Zahid Hussain (first governor State Bank of Pakistan)
 M. Shahid Alam
 Ahmed Muhajir (Founder Managing Director, National Bank of Pakisran)

Business
 Agha Hasan Abedi (UBL; BCCI; FAST; GIK)
 Ameena Saiyid (Oxford University Press)
 Dawood Hercules Group
 Tousuf Dewan Group
 Habib Group
 Hakim Said (Hamdard Pakistan)
 Sikandar Sultan (Shan Foods Industries)
 Syed Ali Raza
 Mirza Mehdy Ispahani
 Mohammad Zahoor
 House of Habib
 Ahmed Muhajir (Founder Managing Director, National Bank of Pakisran)

Law and judiciary
 Ajmal Mian (former Chief Justice of Pakistan)
 Alvin Robert Cornelius (first chief justice of Pakistan)
 Haziqul Khairi (former chief justice of Federal Shariat Court of Pakistan)
 Hamoodur Rahman (former chief justice of Pakistan)
 Majida Rizvi (first woman judge in Pakistani superior judiciary)
 Makhdoom Ali Khan (former attorney general for Pakistan)
 Mohammad Haleem (former chief justice of Pakistan)
 Naimatullah Khan (advocate)
 Nasir Aslam Zahid (former Pakistan Supreme Court judge)
 Nazim Hussain Siddiqui (former chief justice of Pakistan)
 Qadeeruddin Ahmed (former justice of Pakistan)
 Saeeduzzaman Siddiqui (former chief justice and governer of Pakistan)
 Syed Sharifuddin Pirzada (former attorney general for Pakistan and foreign minister; former advisor to prime minister)
 Wajihuddin Ahmed (Chief Justice Sind High Court and Judge Supreme Court of Pakistan)

Metaphysics, spirituality and religion
 Israr Ahmed
 Junaid Jamshed
 Muhammad Muslehuddin Siddiqui
 Muhammad Abdul Wahhab, Ameer Tableegi Jamaat Pakistan
 Muhammad Rafi Usmani, Darul Uloom Korangi Karachi
 Muhammad Taqi Usmani, Darul Uloom Korangi Karachi
 Nasim Amrohvi* Muntakhib al-Haqq, Dean of Islamic Studies, University of Karachi, and Jurisconsult to the Federal Shariat Court
 (Syed) Sulaiman Nadvi
 Maulana Maudoodi

Performing art and media
 Abdul Razzak Yaqoob
 Salman Iqbal
 Adeel Hussain (actor)
 Ali Haider (singer)
 Alamgir Haq (singer)
 Amjad Sabri (Qawwal)
 Anwar Maqsood (drama writer, anchor, actor)
 Arij Fatyma (actress)
 Asim Raza (film producer and director)
 Aziz Mian (Qawwal)
 Behroze Sabzwari (comedian, actor)
 Bilal Maqsood (pop singer, composer)
 Fawad Khan (actor, pop singer)
 Fatima Surayya Bajia (drama writer)
 Habib Wali Mohammad (Ghazal singer and industrialist)
 Izhar Qazi (film and TV actor)
 Jamshed Ansari (comedian)
 Khalida Riyasat (actress)
 Komal Rizvi (singer, actress)
 Lehri (film comedian)
 Mahira Khan (actress)
 Mehdi Hassan (Ghazal Singer)
 Mehnaz Begum (singer)
 Mir Zafar Ali (two-time Oscar Award winner, visual effects specialist)
 Moin Akhtar (actor)
 Nadeem (actor)
 Nadia Ali (singer)
 Naveen Naqvi (anchor)
 Naveen Waqar (actress)
 Nazia Hassan (first female pop singer of Pakistan)
 Nirala (real name: Muzaffar Husain; comedian)
 Nisar Bazmi music director
 Qazi Wajid (comedian)
 Riz Ahmed (actor, rapper and Emmy award winner)
 Salim Nasir (comedian/actor)
 Shaukat Hussain Rizvi (film director, producer, editor, and a supporting actor)
 Shakeel Siddiqui (TV, film and stage actor, comedian)
 Sharmeen Obaid-Chinoy (filmmaker) (two-time Oscar & Emmy awards winner)
 Shehroz Sabzwari (actor)
 Shoaib Mansoor (television producer, television director, writer, musician, lyricist, film director, record producer)
 Syed Kamal (actor)
 Syed Musa Raza (actor)
 Talat Hussain (actor)
 Tabish Ahmed Hashmi (comedian)
 Umer Sharif (comedian)
 Zoheb Hassan (singer)

Sports

Cricketers
 Saeed Anwar (cricketer)
 Asif Iqbal (cricketer)
 Basit Ali (cricketer)
 Faisal Iqbal (cricketer)
 Hanif Mohammad (cricketer)
 Mushtaq Mohammad (cricketer)
 Sadiq Mohammad (cricketer)
 Wazir Mohammad (cricketer)
 Shoaib Mohammad (cricketer)
 Asif Mujtaba (cricketer)
 Iqbal Qasim (cricketer)
 Moin Khan (cricketer)
 Mohammad Sami (cricketer)
 Khalid Latif (Cricketer)
 Javed Miandad (cricketer)
 Shahzaib Hassan (cricketer)
 Khurram Manzoor (cricketer)
 Rashid Latif (cricketer)
 Saadat Ali (cricketer)
 Ashraf Ali (Cricketer)
 Sadiq Mohammad (cricketer)
 Saleem Yousuf (cricketer)
 Sarfraz Ahmed (Cricketer)
 Sikandar Bakht (Cricketer)
 Tauseef Ahmed (cricketer)
 Fawad Alam (cricketer)
 Asad Shafiq (cricketer)
 Saud Shakeel (cricketer)
 Sharjeel Khan (cricketer)
 Rumman Raees (cricketer)
 Danish Aziz (cricketer)
 Faisal Iqbal (cricketer)
 [[Mohammad Hassnain]] (cricketer)
 Azam Khan (cricketer)
 Nadeem Khan (cricketer)
 Tariq Haroon (cricketer)
 Hasan Raza (cricketer)

Hockey players 

 Hanif Khan (Hockey Player)
 Kashif Jawad (hockey)
 Islahuddin (hockey)
 Sohail Abbas (hockey)

Medicine
 Dr. Adeebul Hasan Rizvi (Head of Sindh Institute of Urology and Transplantation) 
 Hakim Said, medical researcher
 Muhammad Ali Shah (orthopaedic surgeon)
 Ziauddin Ahmed (Ziauddin Chain of Hospitals, Ziauddin Medical University

Fictional characters 

 Kamala Khan, Ms. Marvel

References